The  is an administrative district in Tyrol, Austria. It borders Bavaria (Germany) in the north, the districts Imst and Landeck in the south, and Bregenz and Bludenz (both in Vorarlberg) in the west.

Administrative center is Reutte.

Geography 
The district comprises the valleys of the Lech, the Tannheimer Tal, and the so-called Zwischentoren between Reutte and Fern Pass. Mountain ranges in the district include parts of the Lechtal Alps, Wetterstein Mountains, Allgäu Alps and Tannheim Mountains. Prominent lakes include Plansee, Heiterwanger See, Haldensee, and Vilsalpsee.

Administrative divisions 
The 37 municipalities of the district:

 Bach (687)
 Berwang (585)
 Biberwier (632)
 Bichlbach (795)
 Breitenwang (1,532)
 Ehenbichl (810)
 Ehrwald (2,581)
 Elbigenalp (863)
 Elmen (375)
 Forchach (296)
 Grän (580)
 Gramais (54)
 Häselgehr (667)
 Heiterwang (511)
 Hinterhornbach (98)
 Höfen (1,267)
 Holzgau (439)
 Jungholz (308)
 Kaisers (70)
 Lechaschau (2,044)
 Lermoos (1,113)
 Musau (398)
 Namlos (88)
 Nesselwängle (420)
 Pfafflar (125)
 Pflach (1,263)
 Pinswang (416)
 Reutte (6,054)
 Schattwald (427)
 Stanzach (416)
 Steeg (689)
 Tannheim (1,045)
 Vils (1,482)
 Vorderhornbach (261)
 Wängle (848)
 Weißenbach am Lech (1,280)
 Zöblen (239)

 
Districts of Tyrol (state)